This is the list of the number-one albums of the Classical Artist Albums Chart during the 2020s.

Number ones

By artist

Five artists have spent six or more weeks at the top of the Classical Artist Albums Chart during the 2020s. The totals below include only credited performances.

By record label
, Ten record labels have released chart-topping albums so far during the 2020s.

See also

List of UK Albums Chart number ones of the 2020s

References

External links
Classical Artist Albums Top 40 at the Official Charts Company

2020s in British music
United Kingdom Classical Artist Albums
Classical Artist